Guernsey cricket team hosted Jersey cricket team from 31 May to 1 June 2019 to contest the 2019 T20 Inter-Insular Cup, consisted of three Twenty20 International (T20I) matches. The series took place at two grounds in Guernsey: College Field in Saint Peter Port and King George V Sports Ground in Castel. The two sides had played an Inter-Insular match annually since 1950, generally as 50-over contests. A Twenty20 series was played for the first time in 2018, with Jersey winning the inaugural series 3–0.

Following the International Cricket Council's decision to grant T20I status to all matches played between Associate Members after 1 January 2019, this edition was the first to have this enhanced status. Both teams made their T20I debuts with fixtures providing part of their preparations for the European Regional Qualifying tournament for the 2019 ICC Men's T20 World Cup Qualifier. Jersey again won the series 3–0. The first match of the series was the  thirteenth tied T20I match, and the ninth to be won by a Super Over. Jersey's Dominic Blampied was named player of the series after scoring 92 runs and taking 6 wickets.

On 31 May 2019, there was also a one-off Women's Twenty20 International (WT20I) fixture between the two women's teams. Guernsey won the one-off WT20I match by seven wickets. It was the first WT20I match for both teams.

On 31 August 2019, the men's teams played the traditional annual 50-over Inter-Insular Trophy match. This had been replaced by the T20 Cup series in 2018, but both formats will now be played each year with a separate trophy awarded.

T20I series

Squads

1st T20I

2nd T20I

3rd T20I

WT20I match

Squads

Only WT20I

50-over Inter-Insular Trophy
The T20I series was followed later in the year by a 50-over match played on 31 August 2019, which was the 67th annual Inter-Insular Trophy match between the two sides. The Trophy match had been replaced by the T20 Cup series in 2018, but both formats will now be played each year with a separate trophy awarded. Jersey won the rain-affected match by five-wickets to retain the Inter-Insular Trophy.

Squads

Match

Notes

See also
 Inter-Insular cricket
 2018 T20 Inter-Insular Cup
 2022 Men's T20I Inter-Insular Series

References

External links
 Series home at ESPN Cricinfo (Men)
 Series home at ESPN Cricinfo (Women)

Associate international cricket competitions in 2019
International cricket competitions in Guernsey